Anat Ratanapol (Thai: อาณัติ รัตนพล; born 13 September 1947) is a retired Thai sprinter. Between 1970 and 1978, he won two relay and seven individual gold medals at the Asian Games and Asian Athletics Championships, typically medaling in all three events of his events at each competition: 100 m, 200 m, and 4×100 m relay. He retired in 1979 after placing fourth in the 100 m at the Asian Championships. He competed at the 1972 and 1976 Olympics, but failed to reach the finals.

References

1947 births
Living people
Anat Ratanapol
Anat Ratanapol
Athletes (track and field) at the 1972 Summer Olympics
Athletes (track and field) at the 1976 Summer Olympics
Anat Ratanapol
Anat Ratanapol
Anat Ratanapol
Asian Games medalists in athletics (track and field)
Athletes (track and field) at the 1970 Asian Games
Athletes (track and field) at the 1974 Asian Games
Athletes (track and field) at the 1978 Asian Games
Medalists at the 1970 Asian Games
Medalists at the 1974 Asian Games
Medalists at the 1978 Asian Games
Southeast Asian Games medalists in athletics
Anat Ratanapol
Anat Ratanapol
Competitors at the 1977 Southeast Asian Games
Anat Ratanapol
Anat Ratanapol